A parody religion or mock religion is a belief system that challenges the spiritual convictions of others, often through humor, satire, or burlesque (literary ridicule). Often constructed to achieve a specific purpose related to another belief system, a parody religion can be a parody of several religions, sects, gurus, cults, or new religious movements at the same time, or even a parody of no particular religion – instead parodying the concept of religious belief itself. Some parody religions emphasise having fun; the new faith may serve as a convenient excuse for pleasant social interaction among the like-minded.

One approach of parody religions aims to highlight deficiencies in particular pro-religious arguments – following the logic that if a given argument can also be used to support a clear parody, then the original argument is clearly flawed. An example of this is the Church of the Flying Spaghetti Monster, which parodies the demand for equal time employed by intelligent design and creationism.

Occasionally, a parody religion may offer ordination by mail or on-line at a nominal fee, seeking equal recognition for its clergy/officiants – under freedom of religion provisions, including the 1st and 14th amendments to the United States Constitution – to legally solemnise marriages. Parody religions also have sought the same reasonable accommodation legally afforded to mainstream religions, including religious-specific garb or headgear. A U.S. federal court ruled in 2016 that the Church of the Flying Spaghetti Monster ("Pastafarianism") is not a religion, but Pastafarianism or "The Church of the Latter-Day Dude" (Dudeism) have been accommodated to some extent by a few U.S. states and by some other countries.

Several religions that are considered as parody religions have a number of relatively serious followers who embrace the perceived absurdity of these religions as spiritually significant, a decidedly post-modern approach to religion. For instance, in Discordianism, it can be hard to tell whether even these "serious" followers are not just taking part in an even bigger joke.

List of notable parody religions

Parodies of particular beliefs 

The following were created as parodies of particular religious beliefs:

Post-modern religions 
The following post-modern religions that may be seen as elaborate parodies of already-existent religions:

Usage by atheist commentators 

Many atheists, including Richard Dawkins, use parody religions such as those of the Flying Spaghetti Monster and the Invisible Pink Unicorn – as well as ancient gods like Zeus and Thor – as modern versions of Russell's teapot to argue that the burden of proof is on the believer, not the atheist.

Dawkins also created a parody of the criticism of atheism, coining the term athorism, or the firm belief that the Norse deity Thor does not exist. The intention is to emphasize that atheism is not a form of religious creed, but merely denial of specific beliefs.
A common challenge against atheism is the idea that atheism is itself a form of "faith", a belief without proof. The theist might say "No one can prove that God does not exist, therefore an atheist is exercising faith by asserting that there is no God." Dawkins argues that by replacing the word "God" with "Thor" one should see that the assertion is fallacious. The burden of proof, he claims, rests upon the believer in the supernatural, not upon the non-believer who considers such things unlikely. Athorism is an attempt to illustrate through absurdity that there is no logical difference between disbelieving particular religions.

See also
 New religious movement
 Religious satire
 Religious humanism
 Russell's teapot
 Syncretism

Notes and references

External links 
 Inside the Spiritual Jacuzzi article by Jesse Walker about parody religions and other "customized faiths"